Galearieae is a no-longer-recognized tribe of plant of the family Euphorbiaceae. It comprised 3 genera, Galearia, Microdesmis, and Panda. Molecular data show that although these three genera are related to each other, they do not belong in the subfamily Acalyphoideae of the Euphorbiaceae, and therefore they are generally now classified as the family Pandaceae.

See also
 Taxonomy of the Euphorbiaceae

References

Acalyphoideae
Historically recognized angiosperm taxa
Euphorbiaceae tribes